United States v. Lara, 541 U.S. 193 (2004), was a United States Supreme Court landmark case which held that both the United States and a Native American (Indian) tribe could prosecute an Indian for the same acts that constituted crimes in both jurisdictions.  The Court held that the United States and the tribe were separate sovereigns; therefore, separate tribal and federal prosecutions did not violate the Double Jeopardy Clause.

In the 1880s, Congress passed the Major Crimes Act, divesting tribes of criminal jurisdiction in regard to several felony crimes.  In 1990, the Supreme Court ruled in Duro v. Reina that an Indian tribe did not have the authority to try an Indian criminally who was not a member of that tribe.  The following year, Congress passed a law that stated that Indian tribes, because of their inherent sovereignty, had the authority to try non-member Indians for crimes committed within the tribe's territorial jurisdiction.

The defendant, Billy Jo Lara, was charged for acts that were criminal offenses under both the Spirit Lake Sioux Tribe's laws and the federal United States Code. Lara pleaded guilty to the tribal charges, but claimed double jeopardy against the federal charges. The Supreme Court ruled that double jeopardy did not apply to Lara since "the successive prosecutions were brought by separate and distinct sovereign bodies".

Background

History 

The Sioux people consist of three main groups, the Lakota in the west, the Western Dakota in the center, and the Eastern Dakota in the east. In the east, the Santee was originally from the Minnesota area. The Chippewa or Ojibwe people were also from the same general area. The two tribes had been at war from at least 1736 and by 1750 the Chippewa had forced the Santee to the west into the prairie. The war between the tribes continued until at least the 1850s. Only after 1862, when the Santee rose up against the whites and were subsequently removed to the Dakota Territory, did the fighting cease. In 1872, the Sisseton and Wahpeton bands of the Santee signed a treaty that resulted in their moving to the Spirit Lake Reservation.

Major Crimes Act 

Originally, crimes committed by Indians against Indians were not subject to federal or state jurisdiction, but were handled by tribal law.  In 1881, a Brulé Lakota named Crow Dog shot and killed another Indian, Spotted Tail, on the Great Sioux Reservation in South Dakota. Crow Dog was tried in federal court for murder, found guilty, and sentenced to hang.  He petitioned for a writ of habeas corpus to the Supreme Court, and in Ex parte Crow Dog the Supreme Court found that the federal government did not have jurisdiction to try the case.  Crow Dog was ordered released, having made restitution under tribal law to Spotted Tail's family.

In response to Ex Parte Crow Dog, Congress passed the Major Crimes Act in 1885.  The Act provided that the federal government had exclusive jurisdiction over certain Indian-on-Indian crimes when the crimes were committed in "Indian country."  In 1886, the Act was upheld by the Supreme Court in United States v. Kagama.

Duro v. Reina 
In 1990, the Supreme Court held in Duro v. Reina that an Indian tribe did not have jurisdiction to try an Indian of another tribe. Tribal leaders urged Congress to fix the problem that the Duro decision created. In 1991, Congress amended the Indian Civil Rights Act (ICRA) to recognize that Indian tribes had inherent power to exercise criminal jurisdiction over all Indians. This legislation became known as the "Duro fix", and was based on tribal sovereignty rather than a federal delegation of power.

Arrest 
Billy Jo Lara was an enrolled member of the Turtle Mountain Band of Chippewa Indians located in northern North Dakota near the Canada–U.S. border. Lara had married a member of the Spirit Lake Santee tribe and had resided on the Spirit Lake Reservation with her and their children until he was banished from the reservation due to several serious misdemeanors. Lara returned to the reservation, where he was arrested and charged with public intoxication. After the arrest, Bureau of Indian Affairs (BIA) officer Bryon Swan took Lara to the police station where Lara was informed of a Sioux order excluding him from the reservation. Lara then struck Swan, who as a BIA officer was considered both a tribal officer and a federal law enforcement officer.

Procedural history

Trial courts 
Following his arrest, the tribal court of the Spirit Lake Sioux Tribe charged Lara with assaulting the arresting officers, along with four other charges. Lara pleaded guilty to the tribal charge of "violence to a policeman". Soon after, federal prosecutors charged Lara with assault on a federal officer and a federal grand jury indicted him. Lara moved to dismiss the charge based on double jeopardy and other constitutional grounds. The Federal District Court, with Magistrate Judge Alice R. Senechal sitting by consent, denied the motions and Lara entered a conditional guilty plea, reserving the right to appeal. Senechal noted that two other trial courts in the circuit had already ruled that double jeopardy did not apply, that the ICRA only recognized the inherent sovereignty of the tribes and did not delegate prosecutorial power to the tribe. She further noted that another circuit court had ruled the same way. Lara also argued that the Petite doctrine, if applied, would preclude his prosecution, and that since it was never applied to federal prosecutions following convictions in tribal court, it discriminated against Indians. Senechal denied this motion, noting that Lara had shown no examples of other races not being prosecuted for like offenses.

Court of Appeals 
Lara appealed the denial of his motion to dismiss to the Eighth Circuit Court of Appeals, arguing that the Tribal Court obtained its authority from the ICRA, an act of Congress, and that both the Tribal Court and the Federal Court derived their power from the same sovereign. A three-judge panel of the Circuit Court affirmed the decision of the District Court, holding that the tribe derived its power from its own retained sovereignty that was separate from the sovereignty of the United States. The Eighth Circuit's panel noted that in the Duro decision, the Supreme Court had observed that Congress could address the jurisdictional system, which Congress did. When Congress amended the ICRA, they were addressing a federal common law issue, not a constitutional issue, and were within their authority to recognize the sovereignty of the tribes. The panel then affirmed the trial court on the Petite claim. Judge Hansen dissented, believing that the tribe drew its authority to try Lara from the federal government.

Lara then requested a rehearing en banc by the full court. The request was granted, and the full court reversed the decision of the three-judge panel, ordering that the federal indictment be dismissed on the grounds of double jeopardy. While the court noted that the Fifth Amendment allowed prosecution by two separate sovereigns, such as the federal government and a state government, it found that an Indian tribe derived its authority to prosecute offenders from the ICRA, which was federal law. The court noted that in previous Supreme Court rulings, the determination of tribal jurisdiction was based on the tribal membership of the individual, not on his race as an Indian. This meant that double jeopardy attached. The United States then appealed to the Supreme Court, which granted certiorari to hear the case.

Supreme Court

Arguments

United States 
Solicitor General Ted Olson argued that Congress, in response to the Duro decision, acted to "recognize and affirm" the Indian tribe's inherent power to enforce its criminal laws against Indians of other tribes. Olson noted that the United States v. Wheeler decision clearly stated that a tribe could prosecute a tribal member for a crime and that the Federal government could subsequently prosecute for the same criminal acts without invoking double jeopardy if the actions of the accused violated Federal law. Olson noted that the legislative history of the Duro fix bill clearly indicated that Congress intended to restore, not delegate, authority to prosecute non-member Indians by a tribe. The government argued that the limitation in Duro was a statutory limitation of the tribe's sovereignty, not a constitutional limit, and that Congress had the authority to remove that limitation. He noted that a tribe's sovereignty has allowed prosecution of non-member Indians for centuries, until it was limited by Congress. The United States was supported by amicus briefs filed by the State of Washington and seven other states, the State of Idaho and five other states, the National Congress of American Indians, and eighteen Indian tribes.

Lara 
Alexander F. Reichert was appointed by the Supreme Court to argue the case for Lara. Reichert argued that an Indian tribe had no inherent sovereignty in regards to non-member Indians, but only the power that Congress decided to give the tribe, citing Duro, Wheeler, and Oliphant v. Suquamish Indian Tribe to support his argument. He stated that it was the place of the Supreme Court, not Congress, to determine the inherent sovereignty of the tribe. Lara argued that since the tribe had no such inherent sovereignty, it could only prosecute a non-member Indian based upon federal sovereignty, which would make a subsequent Federal prosecution a violation of the prohibition of double jeopardy. It was noted that members of Indian tribes were at the same time United States citizens, and protected under the constitution in the same manner as any other citizen. Reichert stated that Duro was decided as a constitutional issue, not as a matter of common law, and it was the Court's place to determine the issue, not the place of Congress. To subject Lara to a prosecution by a tribal court, which was not subject to the Bill of Rights, would deprive Lara of his rights as a United States citizen. Lara's position was supported by amicus curiae briefs filed by the National Association of Criminal Defense Lawyers, Lewis County, Idaho, (along with several other counties), the Citizen's Equal Rights Foundation, and T. Morris, E. Morris, and R. Morris (individual Indians).

Opinion of the Court 

Justice Stephen Breyer delivered the opinion of the court on April 19, 2004. Breyer believed that the question the Court needed to answer was whether Congress had the authority to relax restrictions that had been imposed on an Indian tribe's inherent sovereignty. He noted that the intent of Congress was clear, not only based on the plain language of the statute, but also from its legislative history.

Breyer stated that the Indian Commerce Clause of the United States Constitution granted Congress "plenary and exclusive" power to legislate in respect to the Indian tribes. He noted that the Indian Treaty Clause did not specifically grant Congress the right to legislate, but that treaties made pursuant to the clause could grant Congress the authority to legislate in regards to treaty matters.

These powers included the ability to both restrict tribal powers or to relax such restrictions. Congress has done both, such as in the withdrawal of federal recognition of the Menominee tribe with the Menominee Termination Act in 1954, and the Menominee Restoration Act to restore tribal recognition and powers. The earlier decisions in Duro, Wheeler, and Oliphant dealt with cases where Congress had restricted a tribe's inherent powers but pointed at nothing in the Constitution or established precedent that prohibits Congress from relaxing such restrictions. The decision in Duro was one of federal common law, and it is clear that Congress has the power to change that law. Since the power exercised by the Spirit Lake Sioux Tribe was that of inherent tribal sovereignty, double jeopardy did not attach.

Breyer noted Lara's other arguments, but as the double jeopardy issue was dispositive, he declined to address those issues. He did note that "we are not now faced with a question dealing with potential constitutional limits on congressional efforts to legislate far more radical changes in tribal status." The decision allowed both courts to prosecute Lara. Since separate sovereign bodies had filed the charges, double jeopardy did not apply to Lara's case. The decision of the Eighth Circuit Court was reversed in the 7–2 decision.

Concurrences

Justice Stevens 
Justice John Paul Stevens wrote a concurring opinion that argued that the Indian tribes have a stronger claim on inherent sovereign powers than do individual states. He noted that the Indian tribes governed themselves since before Columbus arrived, and that most states never governed themselves outside of the United States.

Justice Kennedy 
Justice Anthony Kennedy wrote a concurrence which stated that Congress was very careful to base the changes to the statute on inherent tribal powers and not on a delegation of authority. Kennedy states that is all that is needed to decide the case, but that the Court went further than was necessary when it decided that Congress had the power under the constitution to authorize tribes to prosecute non-member Indians. Finally, Kennedy was concerned that the court did not address the question of the Equal Protection Clause. He would have reversed the Eighth Circuit without going into the additional detail.

Justice Thomas 
Justice Clarence Thomas wrote a concurring opinion stating that it was time to re-examine the entire concept of tribal sovereignty. He noted that doubtful precedents stated that Congress, and not another part of the government had the power to regulate everything that a tribe could or could not do, which renders tribal sovereignty a "nullity." Thomas did not believe that Congress has the constitutional authority to set the "metes and bounds of tribal sovereignty." He noted that such authority was not in the Indian Treaty Clause nor the Indian Commerce Clause.
"In [his] view, the tribes either are or are not separate sovereigns, and our federal Indian law cases untenably hold both positions simultaneously." Thomas further questioned the law ending the practice of making treaties with the tribes, noting that this was the one clear constitutional provision that provides for dealing with other sovereigns. Thomas noted that a delegation of prosecutorial power is always to an executive branch and that the tribes are not part of any executive branch of the Federal government. Therefore, the case hinges on the tribes' inherent sovereignty, and based on precedent, the tribes possess that power.

Dissent 

Justice David Souter wrote a dissenting opinion, which was joined by Justice Antonin Scalia. Souter referenced prior cases dealing with sovereignty and jurisdiction, from the decision made in United States v. Kagama, to the opinion made in South Dakota v. Bourland. Souter stated that the decision in this case did not align with precedent established in previous cases. Since Duro held that the tribes had lost their inherent sovereignty, the only way for the tribes to regain jurisdiction over non-member Indians would be by the delegation of that jurisdiction by Congress. Bourland was even more specific as to that point. Souter believed that the only two ways that the tribes could regain their sovereignty would be for Congress to declare that they were independent of the United States, as it did with the Philippines, or for the Court to overturn the concept of a dependent domestic sovereign.

Souter wrote that this dissonance in court decisions will lead to confusion, stating: "And confusion, I fear, will be the legacy of today's decision, for our failure to stand by what we have previously said reveals that our conceptualizations of sovereignty and dependent sovereignty are largely rhetorical." Souter concluded that he would stand by the decisions made in Duro and Oliphant.

Subsequent developments

Release of Lara 
Lara was released from federal prison on August 19, 2005, about a year and four months after the Supreme Court delivered their decision.

Law reviews 
This case has been the subject of numerous law review articles since the decision was made. Points raised include:
 Indians are very integrated across tribal boundaries, intermarrying across tribes and sharing child and medical care services across tribes. Lara was an example of this; he married a Spirit Lake Sioux woman and moved to that reservation before his exclusion by the tribe.
 "As 'domestic dependent nations,' Indian tribes possess criminal jurisdiction in Indian Country that is 'complete, inherent, and exclusive,' except as limited by Congress."
 The decision enhanced tribal self-determination because tribes could act even in the presence of related federal activity. They noted that Lara had been in numerous altercations with the tribal police at Spirit Lake for intoxication, spousal abuse, and resisting arrest. Only when the tribe ran out of options did it issue an exclusion order to bar him from the reservation.
The decision limited tribal sovereignty by affirming the ability of Congress to relax or to restrict tribal powers. The opinion of Justice Thomas was especially telling in this, as Thomas had opined that plenary power and tribal sovereignty were mutually exclusive.

Books and media 
The case has been widely covered in books and news media. Tribal court authority has been altered by the U.S. government for decades, affecting jurisdictional powers. In Justice Thomas's conclusion at the end of this case, he stated, "History points in both directions." Thomas further stated, "Federal Indian policy, is, to say the least, schizophrenic." Thomas's statements directly address the Supreme Court's confusion on both present and future Federal Indian Policy. As Justice Souter stated in his dissent, this remains "an area peculiarly susceptible to confusion."

See also 
 Tribal sovereignty in the United States

Notes

References

Further reading

External links
 

2004 in United States case law
Native American history of North Dakota
Native American tribal police
Dakota
United States Double Jeopardy Clause case law
United States Native American criminal jurisdiction case law
United States Supreme Court cases
United States Supreme Court cases of the Rehnquist Court